Wunga may refer to:
 Whoonga, a type of heroin used in South Africa
 , an island in North Sumatra, Indonesia

See also 
 Wonga (disambiguation)